July Kaatril is a 2019 Indian Tamil-language romantic comedy film written and directed by KC Sundaram on his directorial debut. The film stars Ananth Nag, Anju Kurian and Samyuktha Menon while Sathish and model Paloma Monnappa in the supportive roles. Joshua Sridhar composed music for the film while cinematography is handled by Demel Xavier Edwards.

Plot 
This is the story of three people: Rajeev, Shreya and Revathi. Rajeev dates Shreya for sometime without being deeply in love but eventually gets engaged to her. Just before their wedding, he meets Revathi and finds her as the love of his life, and so he breaks up the engagement. Rajeev is now passionately in love with Revathi. Revathi, being an independent and a no-nonsense woman who needs her space, finds Rajeev over-imposing him on her. She feels suffocated and breaks up with him. Now with all the three having had break-ups, the film is about how they move on.

Cast 

 Ananth Nag as Rajeev
 Anju Kurian as Shreya
 Samyuktha as Revathi
 Sathish as Murali
 Paloma Monnappa as Athena
 Sruthi Sai as Poorni
 Muthuraman as Subramaniam, Rajeev's father
 Ashwin Kumar Lakshmikanthan as Shreya's yoga classmate
 Pavani Reddy as Natasha
 R. Raja as Gautham
 Priya as Rajeev's mother
 Krishnakumar as Ravichandran, Shreya's father
 Nirmala Krishnakumar as Shreya's mother
 Subhashree Radhakrishnan as Shreya's sister
 Vinod Krishnan as Revathi's father
 Vinod Paranthaman as Rajeev's boss
 V. G. Balasubramaniam as Revathi's ex-boyfriend
 Surya Thangaraj as Vikram
 Karthik as Rajeev's colleague
 Gokul Raj as Rajeev's friend
 Mippu as Restaurant waiter
 Raja as Restaurant waiter
 Deepan Chakravarthi as Andrew
 Shreya Deshpande (special appearance in the song "Kangalin Oramai")

Production 
The project was announced in around late 2017 as the maiden directorial venture by debutant KC Sundaram, who previously served as an assistant to the late director and cinematographer Jeeva who was known for his works in Tamil including the critically acclaimed 2007 film Unnale Unnale. KC Sundaram who worked as co-director along with Jeeva (until his death in 2007) in Unnale Unnale film which was initially suggested to be titled as July Kaatril, revealed the film title as July Kaatril for this project as a tribute to the late director Jeeva who died in 2007.  The portions of the film were mostly shot and set in Chennai, Goa and Kodaikanal.

Popular emerging Malayalam actress Samyuktha Menon was roped into play the second female lead in the film.

Soundtrack 

The album is composed by Joshua Sridhar.

Release 
A critic from Sify noted that "Overall, July Kaatril is a feel-good, breezy romantic film on urban relationships". On the contrary, Thinkal Menon of The Times of India gave the film a rating of two-and-half out of five stars and stated that "The various romantic relationships lack the required energy and one feels exhausted after a certain point".

References

External links 

 

2019 films
Indian romantic comedy films
2019 romantic comedy films
Films shot in Chennai
Films set in Chennai
Films shot in Goa
Films set in Goa
Films shot in Kodaikanal
2019 directorial debut films
Films scored by Joshua Sridhar